For a complete list see :Category:Football clubs in São Tomé and Príncipe

The following is an incomplete list of association football clubs based in São Tomé and Príncipe.

Key

0-9

 
Sao Tome and Principe
Football
Football clubs